Vasily Vasilevich Shevtsov (born 29 April 1975) is a Russian actor best known for playing the role of Denis in the 2007 Sokurov film, Alexandra.

References

External links 
 
 Vasily Shevtsov's profile at IMDb

Living people
1975 births
People from Mogilev
Russian male film actors
Russian male television actors
Place of birth missing (living people)